The Three Musketeers is a 1921 American silent film based on the 1844 novel The Three Musketeers by Alexandre Dumas, père. It was directed by Fred Niblo and stars Douglas Fairbanks as d'Artagnan. The film originally had scenes filmed in the Handschiegl Color Process (billed as the "Wyckoff-DeMille Process"). The film had a sequel, The Iron Mask (1929), also starring Fairbanks as d'Artagnan and DeBrulier as Cardinal Richelieu.

Plot summary

Cast
In opening credits order:
 Adolphe Menjou as Louis XIII
 Mary MacLaren as Anne of Austria
 Nigel De Brulier as Cardinal Richelieu
 Thomas Holding as Duke of Buckingham
 Marguerite De La Motte as Constance Bonacieux 
 Willis Robards as Captain de Treville
 Boyd Irwin as Comte de Rochefort 
 Barbara La Marr as Milady de Winter
 Lon Poff as Father Joseph
 Walt Whitman as d'Artagnan's Father
 Sidney Franklin as Bonacieux 
 Charles Belcher as Bernajoux
 Charles Stevens as Planchet 
 Léon Bary as Athos 
 George Siegmann as Porthos 
 Eugene Pallette as Aramis 
 Douglas Fairbanks as d'Artagnan

Production

The athletic Douglas Fairbanks's one-handed handspring to grab a sword during a fight scene in this film is considered one of the great stunts of the early cinema period. Fairbanks biographer Jeffrey Vance enthuses, "The Three Musketeers was the first of the grand Fairbanks costume films, filled with exemplary  production values and ornamentation. Indeed, one ornament extended beyond the film: Fairbanks wore d'Artagnan's moustache—cultivated for The Three Musketeers—to the end of his life. With The Three Musketeers, he at last found his metier and crystallized his celebrity and his cinema."

Preservation status
In April 1939, Fairbanks donated his entire film collection to the Museum of Modern Art (MoMA), including both a 35mm nitrate negative and a tinted positive print. The negative was duplicated in 1963, and this print was used for the restoration completed in May 2017 by MoMA, the San Francisco Silent Film Festival, and Film Preservation Society. MoMA and Image Protection Services also finished a color restoration in February 2021.

References

External links
 
 
 
 
 
 
 
 
 Color poster

1921 films
1921 adventure films
1920s color films
American silent feature films
American historical adventure films
American black-and-white films
American swashbuckler films
Films based on The Three Musketeers
United Artists films
Films directed by Fred Niblo
Films set in the 1620s
Films set in France
Films set in Paris
Articles containing video clips
Cultural depictions of Cardinal Richelieu
Cultural depictions of Louis XIII
Early color films
1920s American films
Silent historical adventure films
1920s English-language films
1920s historical adventure films